Darren Williams (born 4 September 1967) is an Australian novelist.

Darren Williams is best known for his novel Swimming in Silk which won the prestigious Australian/Vogel Literary Award in 1994. The book has also received much critical acclaim. Speaking about the award some time later, Williams claimed that winning it had increased the pressure on him to write a second book that would be as good, if not better, than the first. He is quoted as saying: "The Vogel begins careers. That's why it's important. It doesn't make it easier to write the second novel." His second novel, Angel Rock, was published in 2002.

Bibliography 
 Swimming in Silk, (1994) 
 Angel Rock, (2002)

External links 
Profile of Darren Williams
The History of The Australian/Vogel Literary Award
His comments about winning the award

1967 births
Australian male novelists
Australian crime writers
Living people